Blue Nun is the fourth album by Carlene Carter. It features two duets with British rocker Paul Carrack: "Oh How Happy" and "Do Me Lover".

Track listing

Track information and credits verified from the album's liner notes.

Personnel 

 Martin Belmont – guitar
 Billy Bremner – guitar, backing vocals
 Bette Bright – backing vocals
 Paul Carrack - Hammond organ, piano, backing vocals
 Carlene Carter – guitar, piano, vocals
 Ginny Clee – backing vocals
 Big Al Downing – backing vocals
 James Eller – bass, backing vocals
 Huw Gower – guitar, backing vocals
 Bobby Irwin – drums, backing vocals
 Nick Lowe – bass, backing vocals
 Glenn Tilbrook – backing vocals
Technical
Paul Bass, Aldo Bocca, Rob Keyloch, Neill King - engineer

References

1981 albums
Carlene Carter albums
F-Beat Records albums
Warner Records albums
Albums produced by Roger Bechirian
Albums produced by Nick Lowe